Tenacibaculum crassostreae is a bacterium from the genus of Tenacibaculum which has been isolated from the oyster Crassostrea gigas from the Wan Island in Korea.

References

External links
Type strain of Tenacibaculum crassostreae at BacDive -  the Bacterial Diversity Metadatabase

Flavobacteria
Bacteria described in 2009